Bernie Murphy (born 1923) was an Irish hurler and Gaelic footballer who played as a midfielder at senior level for the Cork county hurling team.

Born in Cork, Murphy first arrived on the inter-county scene at the age of twenty when he first linked up with the Cork senior hurling team. He made his debut during the 1942 championship before later joining the Cork senior football team. Murphy immediately became a regular member of the starting fifteen and won one All-Ireland medal, one Munster medal and one National Hurling League medal with the hurlers as well as one Munster medal with the footballers.

At club level Murphy was a three-time championship medallist with St Finbarr's.

Throughout his career Murphy made a combined total of 11 championship appearances. His retirement came following the conclusion of the 1949 championships.

References

1923 births
St Finbarr's hurlers
St Finbarr's Gaelic footballers
Cork inter-county hurlers
Cork inter-county Gaelic footballers
All-Ireland Senior Hurling Championship winners
Possibly living people
Dual players